Maria Perrusi (born in Cosenza on 13 September 1991) is an Italian beauty queen and model. She is noted for winning Miss Italia 2009.

Career

After winning Miss Italia 2009, she was featured in various runway shows, and co-hosted L'anno che verrà. She was featured on Ballando con le Stelle (hosted by Milly Carlucci) in March 2010 as a "Ballerina per una notte".

References 

1991 births
Living people
Italian beauty pageant winners
Italian female models